Paul Richard Reuschel (born January 12, 1947) is a former professional baseball pitcher. He played all or part of five seasons in Major League Baseball from 1975 to 1979.

Reuschel began his professional career when he was drafted by the Chicago Cubs in the fourth round of the 1968 amateur draft. On August 21, 1975, he and brother Rick became, as of the end of the 2010 season, the only siblings to combine to pitch a shutout. Rick started a game for the Cubs and pitched 6.1 innings against the Los Angeles Dodgers. Paul pitched the final 2.2 innings for the Cubs' 7–0 win.

References

External links
, or Retrosheet, or Pura Pelota (Venezuelan Winter League)

1947 births
Living people
Baseball players from Illinois
Caldwell Cubs players
Chicago Cubs players
Cleveland Indians players
Major League Baseball pitchers
Midland Cubs players
Navegantes del Magallanes players
American expatriate baseball players in Venezuela
Quincy Cubs players
San Antonio Missions players
Sportspeople from Quincy, Illinois
Tacoma Cubs players
Wichita Aeros players
Western Illinois Leathernecks baseball players